Thomastown is a town in County Kilkenny, Ireland.

Thomastown may also refer to:

Places

Australia
 Thomastown, Victoria, a suburb of Melbourne, Australia
Thomastown railway station, Melbourne
 Electoral district of Thomastown, electorate in Victoria, Australia
Thomastown Province, electorate in Victoria, Australia, abolished in 1988

Ireland
Thomastown railway station at Thomastown, Kilkenny
 Thomastown Castle, County Tipperary, seat of Earl Landaff
 Thomastown (Parliament of Ireland constituency), County Kilkenny, Ireland
 Thomastown, County Kildare, a civil parish in County Kildare, Ireland

United Kingdom
Thomastown, Rhondda Cynon Taf, a village in Wales

United States
 Thomastown Township, Wadena County, Minnesota, a township  
Thomastown, Mississippi, an unincorporated community  
 Thomastown, Virginia, an unincorporated community

Sports teams
Thomastown GAA, Gaelic Athletic Association club at Thomastown, Kilkenny, Ireland
Thomastown Football Club, Australian rules football club at Thomastown, Melbourne, Australis

See also
Thomas Town (fl. 1420), MP for Kent, England